Essie Weingarten is the founder of Essie Cosmetics, Ltd., branded as essie, a major American nail polish brand.

Weingarten, born in 1949, began her career in the cosmetics industry in 1981 when she premiered 12 fashion nail polish colors in Las Vegas, Nevada. She then began distributing her polishes to many salons across the country, and then internationally through distributors in several countries. The company was sold to L'Oreal in 2010.

References

External links
Official site
Official Australia site

American businesspeople
1949 births
Living people
Nail polish
20th-century American businesswomen
20th-century American businesspeople
21st-century American businesswomen
21st-century American businesspeople
American cosmetics businesspeople